The second season of The Good Wife began airing on September 28, 2010, and concluded on May 17, 2011.

Premise

The series focuses on Alicia Florrick, whose husband Peter, the former Cook County, Illinois State's Attorney, has been jailed following a notorious political corruption and sex scandal. After having spent the previous thirteen years as a stay-at-home mother, Alicia returns to the workforce as a litigator to provide for her two children.

The second season follows Alicia, now a full-time employee at Lockhart & Gardner, while still juggling her private life and her professional life. Most of the plot focuses on the arrival of Derrick Bond, who becomes a partner at the firm, changing the lives of the characters forever. As Alicia continues her career and her tame flirtations with Will Gardner, her husband Peter Florrick tries to regain his post as district attorney. At the end of the season, most of the storylines come to a head as Alicia's relationship with private investigator Kalinda Sharma is put to the test.

Cast

Main
 Julianna Margulies as Alicia Florrick
 Matt Czuchry as Cary Agos
 Archie Panjabi as Kalinda Sharma
 Makenzie Vega as Grace Florrick
 Graham Phillips as Zach Florrick
 Alan Cumming as Eli Gold
 Josh Charles as Will Gardner
 Christine Baranski as Diane Lockhart

Recurring
 Chris Noth as Peter Florrick
 Scott Porter as Blake Calamar
 Michael Ealy as Derrick Bond
 Mary Beth Peil as Jackie Florrick
 Titus Welliver as Glenn Childs
 Anika Noni Rose as Wendy Scott-Carr
 Elizabeth Reaser as Tammy Linnata
 Zach Grenier as David Lee
 Mike Pniewski as Frank Landau
 Tim Guinee as Andrew Wiley
 Dreama Walker as Becca
 Michael Boatman as Julius Cain
 Chris Butler as Matan Brody
 Renee Elise Goldsberry as Geneva Pine
 Dallas Roberts as Owen Cavanaugh
 Felix Solis as Kevin Rodriguez
 Skipp Sudduth as Jim Moody
 America Ferrera as Natalie Flores
 Michael J. Fox as Louis Canning
 Mike Colter as Lemond Bishop
 Sonequa Martin-Green as Courtney Wells
 Mamie Gummer as Nancy Crozier
 Denis O'Hare as Charles Abernathy
 Ana Gasteyer as Patrice Lessner
 Rita Wilson as Viola Walsh

Guest
 Gary Cole as Kurt McVeigh
 Martha Plimpton as Patti Nyholm
 Jill Flint as Lana Delaney
 Kevin Conway as Jonas Stern
 Jerry Adler as Howard Lyman
 John Benjamin Hickey as Neil Gross
 Miranda Cosgrove as Sloan Burchfield
 Emily Kinney as Milla Burchfield
 David Paymer as Richard Cuesta
 Kelli Giddish as Sophia Russo
 Rachel Brosnahan as Caitlin Fenton
 Norbert Leo Butz as Mr. Medina
 Susan Misner as Simone Canning
 Christian Pedersen as Scott Bauer

Episodes

Reception
The second season of The Good Wife received critical acclaim. The review aggregator website Rotten Tomatoes reports a 100% certified fresh rating based on 21 reviews. The website's consensus reads, "The Good Wife sophomore season explores exciting new layers of the show's meticulous mythology." On Metacritic, the second season of the show currently sits at an 89 out of 100, based on 8 critics, indicating "universal acclaim".

Awards and nominations

Primetime Emmy Awards
Nominated for Outstanding Drama Series
Won for Outstanding Lead Actress in a Drama Series (Julianna Margulies) (for the episode "In Sickness")
Nominated for Outstanding Supporting Actor in a Drama Series (Josh Charles) (for the episode "Closing Arguments")
Nominated for Outstanding Supporting Actor in a Drama Series (Alan Cumming) (for the episode "Silver Bullet")
Nominated for Outstanding Supporting Actress in a Drama Series (Christine Baranski) (for the episode "Silver Bullet")
Nominated for Outstanding Supporting Actress in a Drama Series (Archie Panjabi) (for the episode "Getting Off")
Nominated for Outstanding Guest Actor in a Drama Series (Michael J. Fox) (for the episode "Real Deal")
Nomination for Outstanding Casting for a Drama Series (Mark Saks)
Nomination for Primetime Emmy Award for Outstanding Cinematography for a Single-Camera Series (One Hour) (Fred Murphy for "Double Jeopardy")

Ratings

DVR Ratings (season 2)

References

2
2010 American television seasons
2011 American television seasons